The 1948 FA Cup final was contested by Manchester United and Blackpool at Wembley Stadium on 24 April 1948. United, who had not appeared in an FA Cup Final for 39 years, won 4–2, with two goals from Jack Rowley and one apiece from Stan Pearson and John Anderson. Eddie Shimwell and Stan Mortensen scored Blackpool's goals. With his goal, Shimwell became the first full-back to score in a Wembley cup final. Blackpool manager Joe Smith decided not to select Jimmy McIntosh for the final despite McIntosh having scored five goals in the five ties leading up to the final. The two sides met in a rearranged league fixture the Monday after the Wembley final. McIntosh was selected to play for Blackpool, who won 1–0 with McIntosh scoring the winner.

The previous month it was announced that Blackpool would not be wearing their traditional tangerine-and-white strip due to its clashing with United's red. Instead, they wore white shirts with black shorts, but would be allowed to wear their normal socks, even though they too came under the auspices of the colour-clash ban. The FA also instructed United to wear blue shirts and white shorts, meaning both teams played in change strip.

Hugh Kelly was the last surviving Blackpool player from the game when he died in March 2009 at the age of 85. The last surviving player from the game was Manchester United goalkeeper Jack Crompton who died in July 2013 at the age of 91.

Match details

References
Specific

General

Report and programme

1948
Fa Cup Final
Fa Cup Final 1948
Fa Cup Final 1948
FA Cup Final
FA Cup Final